PTI-2 (SGT-49) is an indole-based synthetic cannabinoid. It is one of few synthetic cannabinoids containing a thiazole group and is closely related to PTI-1. These compounds may be viewed as simplified analogues of indole-3-heterocycle compounds originally developed by Organon and subsequently further researched by Merck.

See also

 JWH-018
 LBP-1 (drug)
 PTI-1
 PTI-3

References

Indoles
Thiazoles
Cannabinoids
Designer drugs
Isopropylamino compounds
Ethers